The Great Western Railway (GWR) 2884 Class is a class of 2-8-0 steam locomotive. They were Collett's development of Churchward's earlier 2800 Class and are sometimes regarded as belonging to that class.

History 
The 2884s were designed for heavy freight work and differed from the original Class 2800 engines (Nos. 2800-2883) in a number of respects, the most obvious being that a more modern Collett side window cab was provided and that they were built with outside steam pipes.

Production 
83 of the 2884 class were built between 1938 and 1941. Those built during the war did not have the side window to the cab, and the side window on the others was plated over. This was to reduce glare, as a precaution against enemy air attacks. The windows were reinstated after the war.

The locomotives were so popular with the ex-Great Western crews that the British Railways Western Region operating authorities wanted more of the class built after nationalisation in 1948; however, this request was turned down in favour of BR Standard Class 9Fs.

Oil firing 
Between 1945 and 1947, coal shortages caused GWR to experiment with oil fired 2800 locomotives. Eight of the 2884 class were converted and renumbered from 4850. The experiment, encouraged by the government was abandoned in 1948 once the extra maintenance costs were calculated and the bill had arrived for the imported oil.

1948 Locomotive Exchange Trials 
The year 1948 also saw one of the 2884 class, No.3803 (now preserved), emerge remarkably successfully from the 1948 Locomotive Exchange Trials against more modern engines including the LMS 8F and the WD Austerity 2-8-0 and WD Austerity 2-10-0. It took the appearance in 1954 of the British Railways BR standard class 9F 2-10-0 to displace the 2800s from their main role of mineral haulage. Nevertheless, there was still work for them right up to the end of steam on the Western region in 1965. Six decades of service testify to the fundamental excellence of Churchward's original conception.

Withdrawal

Preservation 
Nine examples of the 2884, were saved from Woodham Brothers scrapyard in Barry, Vale of Glamorgan, South Wales and four of these engines have operated in preservation.

Models
Hornby Railways manufacture a model of the 2884 Class in OO gauge.
Dapol produce a model in N gauge.

See also 
 List of GWR standard classes with two outside cylinders

References

External links 

 The Story of the GWR 28XX 2-8-0s 
 No. 3862 under restoration at Northampton and Lamport Railway
 Dinmore Manor Locomotive Ltd

2-8-0 locomotives
2884 Class
Railway locomotives introduced in 1938
Freight locomotives
Standard gauge steam locomotives of Great Britain